4-Heptanone or heptan-4-one is an organic compound with the formula (CH3CH2CH2)2CO. It is a colorless liquid. It is synthesized by ketonization, entailing pyrolysis of iron(II) butyrate.

References 

Heptanones